Cercospora sorghi is a fungal plant pathogen.

References

External links

sorghi
Fungal plant pathogens and diseases